Maralaleng is a village in Kgalagadi District of Botswana. It is located east of the district capital Tshabong and has a primary school. The climate in Maraleng is considered to be a desert climate. The population is 586 according to a 2011 census.

References

Kgalagadi District
Villages in Botswana